Georg Christoph Biller (20 September 1955 – 27 January 2022) was a German choral conductor. He conducted the Thomanerchor as the sixteenth Thomaskantor since Johann Sebastian Bach from 1992 to 2015. He was also a baritone, an academic teacher, and a composer. Active as Thomaskantor after the German reunification, Biller returned the Thomanerchor to its original focus on church music. He was instrumental in the new buildings for the choir's boarding school, the Forum Thomanum, and in the celebration of its 800th anniversary in 2012.

Life and career 
Born in Nebra, the son of a pastor, Biller grew up with three siblings. At age 10, he joined the Thomanerchor in Leipzig, living in its boarding school. He was a member from 1965 to 1974, with Erhard Mauersberger and Hans-Joachim Rotzsch. As Chorpräfekt, he assisted in conducting.

In 1976, Biller founded the Leipziger Vokalkreis which he conducted into the 1990s. In 1980, he became choral conductor at the Gewandhaus and lecturer of choral conducting at the Kirchenmusikschule Halle. In 1982, Biller obtained his diploma in orchestral conducting from the Internationale Sommerakademie Mozarteum Salzburg.

In November 1992, Biller was appointed  as the 16th successor of Bach in this position. Biller returned the Thomanerchor to the original focus on church music, which had been neglected while Leipzig was in East Germany; he established the choir in the liturgy of the Lutheran service and reintroduced , a type of musical vespers service, in the Thomaskirche. The choir performed regularly three times a week there,  every Friday evening and Saturday afternoon, typically including a Bach cantata for the liturgical occasion, and Sunday service.  In 2009, he began performances of the six cantatas of Bach's Christmas Oratorio in St. Thomas and St. Nicholas in services for the feast days of the Christmas season as Bach had intended 275 years earlier.

From 2002, Biller was instrumental in the concept and new buildings for the boarding school of the Thomanerchor, the Forum Thomanum as a musical education campus (musikalischer Bildungscampus). In 2012, Biller celebrated the 800th anniversary of the Thomanerchor. The internationally recognised event, prepared from 2008, was a highlight of his tenure as Thomaskantor. It exposed works by Bach, but also by Biller. He resigned as Thomaskantor in January 2015 for health reasons.

In 1996, he became a member of the Sächsische Akademie der Künste (Academy of Arts of Saxony).

Personal life 
Biller was married to the actress Ute Loeck. He had depression and a serious neurological disease that increasingly limited his motion, and was reliant on a wheelchair from 2019. In the last months of his life, he exchanged thoughts with Andreas Reize, the new Thomaskantor, sure that Reize would continue his work with the choir. Biller died on 27 January 2022, at the age of 66.

Publications

Records 
 J. S. Bach: Matthäus-Passion, Martin Petzold, Andreas Schmidt, Monika Frimmer, Bogna Bartosz, Olaf Bär, Thomanerchor & Gewandhaus Kinderchor, Gewandhausorchester Leipzig, conductor Georg Christoph Biller, Unitel 1998 
 J. S. Bach: Johannes-Passion, Marcus Ullmann, Gotthold Schwarz, Ruth Holton, Matthias Rexroth, Henryk Böhm, Thomanerchor, Gewandhausorchester Leipzig, conductor Georg Christoph Biller, Rondeau 2007

Videos

Writings

Compositions 
Source:

 Eine kleine Thomasmusik (alluding to Mozart's Eine kleine Nachtmusik, 2000) 
 Naunhofer Choralbuch (Naunhof book of chorales, 2000)
 In einem Glauben (In one faith, 2009)
 Der apostolische Segen (The apostolic blessing, 2011)
 Responsorien (2012)
 Gesänge nach Worten von Clemens Brentano (songs after Clemens Brentano, 2012)
 7 Lieder aus Stille (Seven songs from silence, 2012)
 Psalmen David (Psalms of David, 2012)
 Der Nebraer Himmelspsalm (The Nebra heavenly psalm, 2012)
 Res severa verum gaudium (a round, 2012)
 Herr, tue meine Lippen auf (Lord, open my lips, 2012/13) 
 Verleih uns Friede (Grant us peace, 2012/13)
 Hiobs Botschaft (Job's message, 2014/2018)

Awards 
 1985 Osaka Music Prize
 2012 Echo Klassik
 2012 
 2013 Honorary Member of the Richard Wagner Society Leipzig
 2014 Officer's Cross of the Order of Merit of the Federal Republic of Germany

References

External links 

 Georg Christoph Biller on the Thomanerchor website (Archive)
 Das Authentische an Bach ist seine geistliche Dimension (The authenticity of Bach is his spiritual dimension), Interview with Stefan Klöckner on 26 January 2000, in Musica Sacra, also short biography (in German) 
 Georg Christoph Biller & Thomanerchor (recordings of Bach's works) Bach Cantatas Website
 

1955 births
2022 deaths
People from Nebra (Unstrut)
People from Bezirk Halle
German choral conductors
German male conductors (music)
Thomaskantors
University of Music and Theatre Leipzig alumni
Academic staff of the Hochschule für Musik Detmold
Officers Crosses of the Order of Merit of the Federal Republic of Germany
21st-century German conductors (music)
21st-century German male musicians